The coaching staff is a group of non-athletes tied to a sports team. A coaching staff can be existent at all levels of athletics. It is led by a head coach (known as a manager or senior coach in some sports) and consists of one or more assistant coaches, physicians, massage therapists, Athletic trainers, equipment managers, nutritionists and others, all required to pass training courses for reliability.

It has been suggested that when there is an upbeat and positive coaching staff with healthy relationships with the athletes, the outcome and experience of the team as a whole will benefit overall. Although college athletes have the final say where they will be pursuing their academic and athletic careers, coaching staffs and facilities are more often than not are a deciding factor.

See also
Coach (sport)
Sport

References

Terminology used in multiple sports
American football occupations
Sports coaches
Sports occupations and roles